"Without You" is a song by American country music singer Luke Combs featuring American singer-songwriter Amanda Shires on fiddle. It was released in September 2020 as a promotional single from the deluxe edition of Combs' second studio album What You See Is What You Get, titled What You See Ain't Always What You Get.

Background
Lyrically, the song is described as a "stirring ode to the people who have shaped [Combs] into the man he is today". Combs stated "The song is intended to be a thank you to my parents, beautiful wife, Nicole, and my fans. I'm truly a lucky guy. Then having the extremely talented Amanda Shires contribute her beautiful artistry on fiddle took the song to that next level".

Having previously collaborated with Combs when she played fiddle for him during a performance of "Beautiful Crazy" at the 54th Academy of Country Music Awards, Shires explained in an interview with Rolling Stone Country that "[Combs] is just a really cool guy and he said, 'I would love it if you would come play on this.' And I said, 'OK,'. Then we were hanging out playing. I went into the studio alone, because of Covid, with my mask and my gloves, and I put down those fiddle parts. I really, really like how that track came out". She also noted Combs' decision to officially feature her on the single despite not having a vocal part, saying "it's neat that he would come to such a merit-based decision in the country world, where a lot of women aren't credited".

Charts

References

2020 songs
Luke Combs songs
Songs written by Luke Combs